The National Institute of Public Finance and Policy (NIPFP) is an autonomous research institute under India's Ministry of Finance.

History 
Based in New Delhi, India, the centre conducts research on public finance and contributes to the process of policy-making relating to public finance. The NIPFP also works jointly with the Department of Economic Affairs at the Ministry of Finance to research the effects of past economic policy.

NIPFP is overseen by a governing board comprising a chairman and representatives from the Ministry of Finance, Planning Commission of India and Reserve Bank of India. Urjit Patel is the present chairman and Pinaki Chakravarty is the present director of the institute. The previous director was Rathin Roy and chairman was Vijay Kelkar.

Research
Tax policy and administration, especially in reference to reform in the structure and administration of personal and corporate income tax, customs, excise, sales tax, and state-level and local-leveltaxes, as well as the impact of tax incentives on particular sectors.
State fiscal studies and vision documents.
Public expenditure and subsidies with particular reference to the analysis of trends and structural shifts and its management and control.
Government debt both at the centre and states.
Fiscal federalism, relating to the division of fiscal powers between the centre and states, and state and local governments, problems of inter-jurisdictional spillovers and issues of tax harmonisation.
Rural and urban economics and finance including reform of the finances of urban and rural local bodies and institutions.
Environmental and resource economics, examining the use of fiscal instruments for environmental management and improvement.
Financing social sector expenditure particularly, health and education.

Collaborations and partnerships
The NIPFP maintains close functional links with the Central and State Governments in India, and actively collaborates with bilateral and multilateral donor agencies in pursuing its research and training agenda. It serves as a nodal agency for the State Finance Commissions. It has research partnership arrangements with the Indira Gandhi National Open University, Delhi, International Centre for Taxation and Development, IDS, Sussex, UK, University of Surrey, UK, Columbia University, New York, Australian National University, Canberra, and Hitotsubashi University at Tokyo. The Reserve Bank of India (RBI) has established a professorial chair at NIPFP for advancing research frontiers in the fields of macroeconomic and fiscal policy. The NIPFP faculty members are associated with world-wide research networks and serve as members on national and state-level commissions, professional organisations, and management boards of various institutions.

Campus
Spread over an area of 3 acres, the institute is situated near Jawaharlal Nehru University and the Indian Institute of Technology. The campus consists of two academic and an office block, residential quarters, a hostel (guest house).

Library
The three-storied refurbished library houses one of the largest collections of public economics books and reports among all research institutes in the country. It is popular among researchers in the field of public finance owing to its extensive collection of central and state budget documents. The library is centrally air-conditioned with cubicles providing private workspace to the visitors.

Conference facilities
Seminars and conferences are conducted in a state-of-the art auditorium, fitted with overhead projectors, a printable writing board, a public address system, cable/satellite TV connection, and audio and video recording facility, with a capacity to seat more than 60 delegates. The Committee Room and Board Room in the building are used for smaller gatherings.

See also
National Council of Applied Economic Research
List of think tanks in India

References

External links

Research institutes in Delhi
Public finance
Think tanks based in India